The Longman (Scottish Gaelic: An Longman) is an area in the city of Inverness, Scotland. Located north of the city centre, it is bounded by the Moray Firth and River Ness and is home to the largest industrial estate in the city.

At the far west of the Longman is Inverness Harbour, close to which is the Citadel, built by Oliver Cromwell in 1652. Today, only the clock tower remains. Caledonian Stadium, home to Inverness Caledonian Thistle F.C., is situated within the shadow of the Kessock Bridge on the shores of the Moray Firth in the north of the area. The previous main campus of Inverness College is in the Longman.

References

Areas of Inverness